Politics of Korea may mean:
Joseon Dynasty politics, regarding the dynasty which ruled Korea from 1392 to 1897
Politics of North Korea
Politics of South Korea

See also
North Korea–South Korea relations, often referred to as "inter-Korean politics"